Zoran Cilinšek (born 20 March 1976) is a Serbian retired footballer.

References

External sources
 Profile at Srbijafudbal
 Profile and stats until 2003 at Dekisa.Tripod

1976 births
Living people
People from Bečej
Serbian footballers
Association football midfielders
OFK Bečej 1918 players
FK Vojvodina players
FK Cement Beočin players
FK ČSK Čelarevo players
FK Budućnost Banatski Dvor players
FK Kabel players
R. Charleroi S.C. players
Belgian Pro League players
Expatriate footballers in Belgium
NK Olimpija Ljubljana (1945–2005) players
Expatriate footballers in Slovenia
Expatriate footballers in Azerbaijan
FK Slavija Sarajevo players
Serbian expatriate sportspeople in Azerbaijan